Marilao station is a former railway station located on the North Main Line in Bulacan, Philippines. The station was once part of the line until its discontinuation in 1988. It is currently being rebuilt as part of the first phase of the North–South Commuter Railway. The new station will be linked to SM City Marilao.

History 
The station was first closed in 1984, but was reopened in 1990 under the Metrotren project. It was abandoned when the North Main Line ceased operations in 1997. The old station was then demolished sometime after.

The station was to be rebuilt as a part of the Northrail project, which involved the upgrading of the existing single track to an elevated dual-track system, converting the rail gauge from narrow gauge to standard gauge, and linking Manila to Malolos in Bulacan and further on to Angeles City, Clark Special Economic Zone and Clark International Airport. The project commenced in 2007, but was repeatedly halted then discontinued in 2011.

References

Philippine National Railways stations
Railway stations in Bulacan
Proposed railway stations in the Philippines